"Land of the Innocent" is the first track on the 2013 full-length If All Now Here by the American electronic/synth band Feathers.  It was initially released as a stream through the act's social media outlets in 2012, and later as a digital single on March 4, 2013.  The single's b-side is a remix of the song by the Liverpool-based act Outfit.  The Guardian wrote that the song "neatly expresses Feathers' desire to combine a dystopian future-world aesthetic with a pop sensibility and rhythms tough enough to pass muster in the realm of the industrial."

Music video
The music video for the song was directed by Allie Avital Tsypin, known for her work with School of Seven Bells and Marnie Stern, over two days in 108 degree heat outside of Austin, Texas. The video premiered February 1, 2013 on UK blog The Line of Best Fit, and was Bust Magazine's Video of the Day on February 8, 2013.

Track listing

Credits
Mixing - Steven DePalo
Mastering - Howie Weinberg

References

External links
 

2013 singles
2012 songs